Kennedy Collier Chandler (born September 16, 2002) is an American professional basketball player for the  Memphis Grizzlies of the National Basketball Association (NBA). He played college basketball for the Tennessee Volunteers. He was a consensus five-star recruit and one of the top point guards in the 2021 class. In his senior season of high school, he was named a McDonald's All-American, as well as being selected to the rosters of the Jordan Brand Classic and the Nike Hoop Summit.

In his only season at Tennessee, Chandler was named to the Second Team All-SEC and the SEC All-Freshman Team. He was drafted 38th overall in the 2022 NBA draft by the San Antonio Spurs, but was later traded to the Grizzlies.

High school career
Chandler began playing varsity basketball for Briarcrest Christian School in Eads, Tennessee while in eighth grade. As a freshman, he came off the bench and helped his team reach the Division II-AA semifinals. In his sophomore season, Chandler averaged 19.5 points, four rebounds and 3.1 assists per game. He led Briarcrest to the DII-AA state title, earning tournament most valuable player honors after scoring 20 points in a 65–54 win over Brentwood Academy. He was named DII-AA Tennessee Mr. Basketball. After the season, Chandler won the Nike Elite Youth Basketball League Peach Jam with Mokan Elite. As a junior, he averaged 22.2 points, 4.3 assists and 2.6 steals per game, leading his team to a state runner-up finish and being named DII-AA Tennessee Mr. Basketball for his second straight year. Chandler transferred to Sunrise Christian Academy in Bel Aire, Kansas for his senior season to help prepare for the college level. As a senior, he averaged 14.8 points, 4.2 rebounds and 3.3 steals per game, leading his team to a 21–4 record. Chandler was named to the rosters for the McDonald's All-American Game, Jordan Brand Classic and Nike Hoop Summit.

Recruiting
Chandler received basketball scholarship offers from Florida, Arizona State and Ole Miss, among others, during his first two years of high school. He emerged as a five-star recruit prior to his junior season. On August 14, 2020, Chandler committed to playing college basketball for Tennessee over offers from Duke, Kentucky, North Carolina and Memphis.

College career
In his college debut, Chandler posted 20 points and four assists in a 90–62 win against UT Martin. On December 4, 2021, he scored 28 points in a 69–54 win over Colorado. Chandler was named to the Second Team All-SEC as well as the All-Freshman Team. He averaged 13.9 points, 4.7 assists and 2.2 steals per game. On April 5, 2022, Chandler declared for the 2022 NBA draft, forgoing his remaining college eligibility. Chandler was a projected top twenty pick in the 2022 NBA draft.

Professional career

Memphis Grizzlies (2022–present) 
Chandler was drafted 38th overall by the San Antonio Spurs in the 2022 NBA draft. On June 24, 2022, a day after the draft, he was traded to the Memphis Grizzlies in exchange for a 2024 second-round pick. On July 6, Chandler signed a four-year, $7.1 million rookie scale contract with the Grizzlies. The deal set a record for the most guaranteed money ($4.9 million) given to an American-born second round draft pick on his rookie contract. He joined the Grizzlies for the 2022 NBA Summer League. Chandler made his Summer League debut on July 5, recording eight points, four rebounds, four assists, four steals and three blocks in a 103–99 win over the Philadelphia 76ers. On October 22, he made his NBA debut, recording two assists and two blocks in a 137–96 loss to the Dallas Mavericks.

National team career
Chandler represented the United States at the 2021 FIBA Under-19 World Cup in Latvia. He averaged 7.7 points and 3.4 assists per game, helping his team win the gold medal.

Career statistics

College

|-
| style="text-align:left;"| 2021–22
| style="text-align:left;"| Tennessee
| 34 || 34 || 30.8 || .464 || .383 || .606 || 3.2 || 4.7 || 2.2 || .2 || 13.9

References

External links

Tennessee Volunteers bio
USA Basketball bio

2002 births
Living people
American men's basketball players
Basketball players from Memphis, Tennessee
McDonald's High School All-Americans
Memphis Grizzlies players
Point guards
San Antonio Spurs draft picks
Tennessee Volunteers basketball players